The 9 mm Mars is an experimental centerfire pistol cartridge developed in the late 19th century based on necking down the .45 Mars Long case.  The bullet has two deep cannelures, and the case is crimped into both.  The case mouth is chamfered on the outside to fit flush into the forward cannelure.  This elaborate bullet seating was necessary to withstand the violent feed mechanism of the Mars Automatic Pistol.  The cartridge headspaces on the shoulder adjacent to the neck.  The case has a thin rim and deep extractor groove in comparison to most rimless pistol cartridges.  There was a very similar 8.5mm Mars cartridge firing a 139 grain bullet at 1550 feet per second.  The Mars cartridges were publicized as the most powerful handgun cartridges through the early 20th century; but less than 100 pistols were made and manufacture ceased in 1907.

See also 
 9mm caliber
 Table of handgun and rifle cartridges

References

Pistol and rifle cartridges